Spring Valley station may refer to:
Spring Valley station (New York), a Metro-North Railway and NJ Transit station in Spring Valley, New York
Spring Valley station (DART), a DART Light Rail station in Richardson, Texas

See also 
 Spring Valley (disambiguation)